Pierre-Hugues Herbert and Albano Olivetti won the title, beating Marc Gicquel and Josselin Ouanna 6–3, 6–7(5–7), [15–13]

Seeds

Draw

Draw

References
 Main Draw

Trophee des Alpilles - Doubles
2013 Doubles